Lamiel is a 1967 French historical drama film. It was directed by Jean Aurel and stars Anna Karina, Michel Bouquet, and Jean-Claude Brialy.

The film is based on Stendhal's unfinished last novel, Lamiel. A costume drama set in the 19th century, it centers on the young orphan Lamiel (Karina) as she rises from poverty into high society under the guidance of a doctor (Bouquet), who lives vicariously through her. She eventually marries a bankrupt comte (Brialy), but falls for a thief who breaks into her bedroom one night.

Cast
 Anna Karina as Lamiel
 Michel Bouquet as Le docteur Sansins
 Denise Gence as La duchesse de Miossens
 Marc Eyraud as M. Hautemare
 Denise Péron as Mme. Hautemare
 Pierre Clémenti as Fedor
 Jean-Claude Brialy as Le comte d'Aubigné
 Claude Dauphin as Le marquis d'Orpiez
 Robert Hossein as Valber
 Bernadette Lafont as Pauline
 Jean-Pierre Moulin as Le facteur
 Alice Sapritch as Mme Legrand
 Christian Barbier as Vidocq

References

External links

1967 films
1960s French-language films
Films based on works by Stendhal
Films directed by Jean Aurel
French historical drama films
1960s historical drama films
Films set in the 19th century
1967 drama films
1960s French films